John Berchmans Sullivan (born Sedalia, Missouri October 10, 1897 – died Bethesda, Maryland January 29, 1951) was a member of the United States House of Representatives from Missouri.  He was a Democrat.  He was married to Leonor Kretzer Sullivan.

Sullivan was born in Sedalia and moved to St. Louis, Missouri at the age of 13.  He attended parochial schools in Sedalia and St. Louis and graduated from Saint Louis University in 1918.  During World War I he enlisted in the Army and served as a private in the infantry.  He received his J.D. degree from Saint Louis University School of Law in 1922 and began working in private practice.  He also became active in state and local politics.

From 1936 to 1938 he served as associate city counselor in St. Louis and from 1938 to 1940 he served as secretary to Mayor Bernard F. Dickmann.  In 1940 he was elected to Congress.  He was defeated in a bid for re-election in 1942, but was again elected to Congress in 1944.  He was again defeated in 1946, but made another come-back in 1948.  In 1950 he was re-elected.  He died January 29, 1951, of a cerebral hemorrhage and was buried at Calvary Cemetery in St. Louis.  In 1952 his widow Leonor Sullivan was elected to Congress and served until her retirement in 1976.

See also
 List of United States Congress members who died in office (1950–99)

References

External links
Official Congressional Biography
 
 Memorial services held in the House of Representatives together with remarks presented in eulogy of John Berchmans Sullivan, late a representative from Missouri

1897 births
1951 deaths
People from Sedalia, Missouri
Politicians from St. Louis
Saint Louis University alumni
Saint Louis University School of Law alumni
Democratic Party members of the United States House of Representatives from Missouri
United States Army soldiers
20th-century American politicians